The Emcee's Properganda is Jin's second studio album. It was released on October 25, 2005. The whole album was produced by Golden Child with the exception of "Properganda", which was produced by Demo. The album was recorded at No Mystery Studios and engineered by Vinny Nicoletti. The album was mixed at Storm Studios by Storm. "Top 5 (Dead or Alive)" was released as a 12" vinyl single with "Perspectives" as the B-side. The music video for "Top 5 (Dead or Alive)" was directed by Todd Angkasuwan. The song "G.O.L.D.E.N." was used on the soundtrack of the video-game Saints Row on the fictional radio station KRHYME 95.4.

Track listing
All tracks produced by Golden Child, with the exception of track 6 "Properganda" produced by Demo.

Samples
The Emcee
Samples speech said by KRS-One in the DVD "The MC: Why We Do It"
Perspectives
Contains additional sampled speech from KRS-One
Contains lyrics from "I Can" by Nas
Top 5 (Dead or Alive)
Contains vocal samples from Nas as performed in "Ether"
Contains vocal samples from Jadakiss as performed in "Made You Look (Remix)" by Nas
Mr. Popular
Contains vocal samples from Big L as performed in "Put It On"
Contains vocal samples from James Brown as performed in "Hot Pants"
Properganda
Contains an interpolation of "If I Ruled the World (Imagine That)" by Nas
No More Fans
Contains an interpolation of "Urvashi Urvashi" by Humse hai Muqabala
G.O.L.D.E.N.
Contains lyrics from "We Gonna Make It" as performed by Jadakiss,
Contains Just Blaze's phrase
Foolish Little Girls
 Samples "Foolish Little Girl" by The Shirelles
The Craftiest
 Voice clips of fans
No Concept
 Contains an interpolation of "Check the Rhime" by A Tribe Called Quest

References

MC Jin albums
2005 albums